is a 2005 Japanese drama film directed by Tatsushi Ōmori and based on a 1998 novel by Mangetsu Hanamura.  Released without approval from Eirin, the film details abuse in a tight-knit Catholic farming community where a teenager who has committed murder takes refuge.

References

External links

2005 films
2000s Japanese-language films
2005 drama films
Japanese drama films
Zoophilia in culture
Films critical of the Catholic Church
Films based on Japanese novels
Films directed by Tatsushi Ōmori
2000s Japanese films